Bhola Shankar is an upcoming Indian Telugu-language action masala film directed by Meher Ramesh. An official remake of the 2015 Tamil film Vedalam, it stars Chiranjeevi as the titular character with Tamannaah and Keerthy Suresh.  

Bhola Shankar is scheduled for a theatrical release in May 2023.

Premise 
After helping the cops in busting down a smuggling operation, Bhola Shankar, a former gangster-turned-taxi driver, incurs the wrath of a crime syndicate following which he learns about the gangsters behind the smuggling and decide to hunt them as they caused harm to his adopted sister in the past.

Cast 
 Chiranjeevi  as Bhola Shankar
 Tamannaah as Sirisha
 Keerthy Suresh as Gayatri
 Vennela Kishore as Konda Reddy
 Sushanth as Kranthi
 Rashmi Gautam as Padma
 Tulasi as Parvati

Production 
Initially, Sai Pallavi was approached for Chiranjeevi's sister role in the film but she rejected due to creative differences. Keerthy Suresh was cast in her place. Music director Mani Sharma's son Mahati Swara Sagar was signed onto this film as the composer. Tamannaah is cast opposite Chiranjeevi in their second collaboration after Sye Raa Narasimha Reddy (2019). An official launch was held on 11 November 2021. The shoot began on 15 November 2021. In December 2021, the film completed its first schedule. In January 2022, a new schedule started with Chiranjeevi joining the set.

Music
The music is composed by Mahati Swara Sagar, son of veteran composer Mani Sharma.  Lyrics are written by Ramajogayya Sastry, Sri Mani, and Kasarala Shyam.

Release

Home Media
The digital rights of the film were acquired by Netflix.

References

External links 
 

Upcoming films
Upcoming Telugu-language films
Upcoming Indian films
Indian action drama films
Films shot in Hyderabad, India
Telugu remakes of Tamil films